is a former Japanese football player.

Playing career
Kawamoto was born in Nagoya on September 25, 1982. After graduating from high school, he joined J2 League club Oita Trinita in 2001. Although Trinita won the champions in 2002 season and was promoted to J1 League, he could not play at all in the match until 2003. In 2004, he moved to Japan Football League (JFL) club Ehime FC. Although he could not play many matches, Ehime won the champions in 2005 season and was promoted to J2 from 2006. In 2006, he played 14 matches in J2. In 2007, he moved to JFL club Sagawa Printing. He played as regular goalkeeper in 2007 season. However his opportunity to play decreased from 2008. In 2012, he moved to JFL club Zweigen Kanazawa. However he could not play at all in the match and retired end of 2012 season.

Club statistics

References

External links

j-league

1982 births
Living people
Association football people from Aichi Prefecture
Japanese footballers
J1 League players
J2 League players
Japan Football League players
Oita Trinita players
Ehime FC players
SP Kyoto FC players
Zweigen Kanazawa players
Association football goalkeepers